There are nineteen federal academies run by the United States federal government.

Five are United States service academies:
 United States Military Academy, also known as "West Point" and "Army", founded 1802
 United States Naval Academy, also known as "Annapolis" and "Navy", founded 1845
 United States Air Force Academy, founded 1954
 United States Coast Guard Academy, founded 1876
 United States Merchant Marine Academy, also known as "Kings Point", founded 1942

Nine other academies can be loosely classified as a military academy, most of which are graduate schools:
 Uniformed Services University of the Health Sciences, founded 1972
 The National Defense University, also known as "NDU", founded 1976
 Air Force Institute of Technology 
 Air War College 
 Marine Corps University 
 Naval Postgraduate School 
 Naval War College 
 United States Army Command and General Staff College 
 United States Army War College 

There are five federal non-military academies:
 The Foreign Service Institute, founded 1947
 The Federal Law Enforcement Training Center, founded 1970
 United States National Mine Health and Safety Academy, founded 1971
 The FBI Academy, founded 1972
 The National Fire Academy, also known as "NFA", founded in 1976

See also
List of defunct United States military academies

Federal academies
Federal academies